Hinsdale Township High School District 86 is a high school district headquartered in Hinsdale, Illinois, serving Hinsdale and Darien.

It operates Hinsdale Central High School and Hinsdale South High School.

Hinsdale Township High School District 86 
Hinsdale Township High School District 86 has more than 4000 students in grades 9 through 12. The student-to-teacher ratio is currently 14:1, whereas the national average is 17:1. It provides an educational environment that strives for excellence, respect, and responsibility. District 86 has strong belief in diversity and that all students are capable. The first class to graduate from Hinsdale High School was in 1883. District 86 was formed when the elementary school and high school were split into separate districts. Originally, there was only Hinsdale High school (located in Hinsdale and later known as Hinsdale Township High School), but a 1962 referendum provided for a 2nd school: Hinsdale South High School (located in Darien, Illinois).

Academics 
District 86 has a graduation rate of 91%. The number of students who miss more than 10% of school days is only 14%. As of 2018, the average SAT testing scores for math are 590.3 and for English Language Arts are 584.1. In 2017, the average spending per student for operational purposes was $20,397 and for instructional purposes was $12,849. More than 90% of teachers return to work for the school district each year.

2019 Referendum 
Hinsdale High School District 86 proposed to cut activities such as football, wrestling, swimming, cheerleading, and even marching band in order to save money. However, voters approved a $140 million bond referendum. which meant these measures would not be needed. The referendum called for an increase in property tax; a house worth $500,000 should expect to pay roughly $283 more in annual property taxes.

Notable alumni

Hinsdale Central High School 
Jim Aylesworth '61- children's book author, and teacher

Brian Torff '72 - bassist, teacher, and composer

Hinsdale South High School 
Barbara Woods '80 - actress, Honey, I Shrunk the Kids: The TV Show

Enrollment and Equity Issues 
Some have criticized educational equity in the district. The 2021 school district report card showed that Hinsdale Central has nearly twice the enrollment of students as Hinsdale South, causing a disparity of course offerings. However, proposed revisions of the attendance boundaries have not been palatable solutions for some district residents.

References

External links 
 

School districts in DuPage County, Illinois